August Nörmiger (ca. 15601613) was a German composer and court organist in Dresden.  He was born and died in Dresden.

The main source for Nörmiger's compositions is the manuscript Organ tabulature "Tabulaturbuch auff dem Instrumente", which he compiled for Sophie von Sachsen in 1598. He gives few indications as to his sources.

Recordings 
 Mattasin oder Toden Tanz 1598 (an example of Danse macabre) on Ars Moriendi Huelgas Ensemble, dir. Paul Van Nevel.
 4 dances Tantz Von Gott Will Ich Nicht Lassen etc. on Sacred music of the Renaissance; Monte, Lassus, White. by Huelgas Ensemble, dir. Paul Van Nevel (LP CD)"Seon" 60705. 1978
 Churf. Sachs. Witwen Erster Mummerey Tanz (1598) and Der Mohren Auftzugkh (1598). Organ tuned to quarter-comma meantone (pure thirds) temperament, played by Andrew Pink.

References 

1560s births
1613 deaths
German classical composers
Renaissance composers
German male classical composers